In 2004, several coins of the state quarter series were printed with a misprint on the design for the Wisconsin coin. These coins featured an extra leaf on the left side of the corn cob on the coin. These coins become particularly valuable, often selling for several hundred dollars on sites such as eBay.

Mistake 
Some Wisconsin quarter errors were found with an "extra cornstalk leaf" – either pointing down ("Low Leaf") or pointing up ("High Leaf"). The normal cause would be metal shavings accidentally lodged in the die, creating a gouge from the coin striking action. These were found notably in the Tucson area.

Cause 
The cause for the error is not clear, but experts have ideas. Some believed the raised features next to the ear of corn were the result of curved metal shavings becoming accidentally lodged in the coin die, which eventually got pounded into the die itself by the coin striking action, leaving a gouge in the die. As more coins were struck by the same die, coin metal flowed into the gouged area, giving the coin an appearance of another leaf. Evidence for this includes the fact that these “leaves” fall far short of proper design definition, are awkwardly placed, and lack proper definition. There is also speculation that the leaf wasn't a mistake, but an Easter egg, since the chances of a chipping that coincidentally had the shape of a leaf occurring right next to the corn cob have been deemed highly unlikely.

Reaction 
These coins became very well known, with sales of sometimes over 500 U.S. dollars taking place regularly.

References

Modern United States commemorative coins
Twenty-five-cent coins of the United States